The 2006 San Diego Padres season was the 38th season in franchise history. The Padres captured their second consecutive National League West crown, with a record of 88–74, tied with the Los Angeles Dodgers by virtue of winning the season series 13–5 against the Dodgers. The 2006 season also marked the end of Bruce Bochy's tenure as manager of the team, after 24 seasons overall, 12 seasons as manager (1995–2006), winning 4 division titles (1996, 1998, 2005, 2006). The Padres were eliminated in the 2006 National League Division Series by the eventual World Series champion St. Louis Cardinals, losing 3–1.

Offseason
 November 18, 2005: Xavier Nady was traded by the San Diego Padres to the New York Mets for Mike Cameron.
December 2, 2005: Pete LaForest was selected off waivers by the San Diego Padres from the Tampa Bay Devil Rays.
December 5, 2005: Brian Giles was signed as a free agent with the San Diego Padres.
December 7, 2005: Dewon Brazelton was traded by the Tampa Bay Devil Rays to the San Diego Padres for Sean Burroughs.
December 22, 2005: Mark Bellhorn was signed as a free agent with the San Diego Padres.
 January 4, 2006:  Adam Eaton, Akinori Otsuka, and Billy Killian were traded to the Texas Rangers in exchange for Adrián González, Chris Young, and Terrmel Sledge.
January 12, 2006: Alan Embree was signed as a free agent with the San Diego Padres.
 February 3, 2006: Mike Piazza signed as a free agent with the San Diego Padres.
 May 1, 2006:  Doug Mirabelli was traded to the Boston Red Sox in exchange for Josh Bard and Cla Meredith.

Regular season

Opening Day starters
Played at Petco Park on April 3, 2006 against the San Francisco Giants.

San Diego 6, San Francisco 1

Season standings

National League West

 NOTE: Although the Padres final record equaled that of the Los Angeles Dodgers, the Padres record of 13-5 against the Dodgers awarded them of the official division title.

Record vs. opponents

Transactions
June 6, 2006: David Freese was drafted in the 9th round of the 2006 amateur draft.
August 24, 2006: Russell Branyan was traded by the Tampa Bay Devil Rays to the San Diego Padres for a player to be named later and Evan Meek (minors). The San Diego Padres sent Dale Thayer (minors) (September 15, 2006) to the Tampa Bay Devil Rays to complete the trade.

Game log

|- align="center" bgcolor="#bbffbb"
| 1 || April 3 || Giants || 6–1 || || || || || 1–0
|- align="center" bgcolor="#ffbbbb"
| 2 || April 5 || Giants || 1–3 || || || || || 1–1
|- align="center" bgcolor="#ffbbbb"
| 3 || April 7 || Rockies || 4–10 || || || || || 1–2
|- align="center" bgcolor="#ffbbbb"
| 4 || April 8 || Rockies || 4–12 || || || || || 1–3
|- align="center" bgcolor="#ffbbbb"
| 5 || April 9 || Rockies || 4–10 || || || || || 1–4
|- align="center" bgcolor="#bbffbb"
| 6 || April 11 || @ Marlins || 9–3 || || || || || 2–4
|- align="center" bgcolor="#bbffbb"
| 7 || April 12 || @ Marlins || 7–2 || || || || || 3–4
|- align="center" bgcolor="#ffbbbb"
| 8 || April 13 || @ Marlins || 2–9 || || || || || 3–5
|- align="center" bgcolor="#ffbbbb"
| 9 || April 14 || @ Braves || 4–5 || || || || || 3–6
|- align="center" bgcolor="#ffbbbb"
| 10 || April 15 || @ Braves || 0–2 || || || || || 3–7
|- align="center" bgcolor="#bbffbb"
| 11 || April 16 || @ Braves || 4–3 || || || || || 4–7
|- align="center" bgcolor="#bbffbb"
| 12 || April 17 || @ Rockies || 5–2 || || || || || 5–7
|- align="center" bgcolor="#ffbbbb"
| 13 || April 18 || @ Rockies || 2–3 || || || || || 5–8
|- align="center" bgcolor="#bbffbb"
| 14 || April 19 || @ Rockies || 13–4 || || || || || 6–8
|- align="center" bgcolor="#ffbbbb"
| 15 || April 20 || Mets || 2–7 || || || || || 6–9
|- align="center" bgcolor="#bbffbb"
| 16 || April 21 || Mets || 2–1 || || || || || 7–9
|- align="center" bgcolor="#ffbbbb"
| 17 || April 22 || Mets || 1–8 || || || || || 7–10
|- align="center" bgcolor="#bbffbb"
| 18 || April 23 || Mets || 7–4 || || || || || 8–10
|- align="center" bgcolor="#ffbbbb"
| 19 || April 24 || Dbacks || 1–4 || || || || || 8–11
|- align="center" bgcolor="#ffbbbb"
| 20 || April 25 || Dbacks || 0–7 || || || || || 8–12
|- align="center" bgcolor="#ffbbbb"
| 21 || April 26 || Dbacks || 2–3 || || || || || 8–13
|- align="center" bgcolor="#ffbbbb"
| 22 || April 28 || Dodgers || 0–3 || || || || || 8–14
|- align="center" bgcolor="#ffbbbb"
| 23 || April 29 || Dodgers || 2–4 || || || || || 8–15
|- align="center" bgcolor="#bbffbb"
| 24 || April 30 || Dodgers || 6–5 || || || || || 9–15
|-

|- align="center" bgcolor="#bbffbb"
| 25 || May 1 || @ Giants || 10–4 || || || || || 10–15
|- align="center" bgcolor="#bbffbb"
| 26 || May 2 || @ Giants || 5–3 || || || || || 11–15
|- align="center" bgcolor="#bbffbb"
| 27 || May 3 || @ Dodgers || 11–5 || || || || || 12–15
|- align="center" bgcolor="#bbffbb"
| 28 || May 4 || @ Dodgers || 3–0 || || || || || 13–15
|- align="center" bgcolor="#bbffbb"
| 29 || May 5 || Cubs || 1–0 || || || || || 14–15
|- align="center" bgcolor="#bbffbb"
| 30 || May 6 || Cubs || 2–1 || || || || || 15–15
|- align="center" bgcolor="#bbffbb"
| 31 || May 7 || Cubs || 6–3 || || || || || 16–15
|- align="center" bgcolor="#bbffbb"
| 32 || May 8 || Cubs || 8–3 || || || || || 17–15
|- align="center" bgcolor="#ffbbbb"
| 33 || May 9 || Brewers || 4–5 || || || || || 17–16
|- align="center" bgcolor="#bbffbb"
| 34 || May 10 || Brewers || 3–0 || || || || || 18–16
|- align="center" bgcolor="#bbffbb"
| 35 || May 11 || Brewers || 8–5 || || || || || 19–16
|- align="center" bgcolor="#bbffbb"
| 36 || May 12 || @ Cubs || 10–5 || || || || || 20–16
|- align="center" bgcolor="#bbffbb"
| 37 || May 13 || @ Cubs || 4–3 || || || || || 21–16
|- align="center" bgcolor="#bbffbb"
| 38 || May 14 || @ Cubs || 9–0 || || || || || 22–16
|- align="center" bgcolor="#ffbbbb"
| 39 || May 15 || @ Dbacks || 5–6 || || || || || 22–17
|- align="center" bgcolor="#ffbbbb"
| 40 || May 16 || @ Dbacks || 2–5 || || || || || 22–18
|- align="center" bgcolor="#bbffbb"
| 41 || May 17 || @ Dbacks || 14–10 || || || || || 23–18
|- align="center" bgcolor="#ffbbbb"
| 42 || May 19 || @ Mariners || 4–7 || || || || || 23–19
|- align="center" bgcolor="#ffbbbb"
| 43 || May 20 || @ Mariners || 3–6 || || || || || 23–20
|- align="center" bgcolor="#ffbbbb"
| 44 || May 21 || @ Mariners || 8–10 || || || || || 23–21
|- align="center" bgcolor="#ffbbbb"
| 45 || May 22 || Braves || 1–3 || || || || || 23–22
|- align="center" bgcolor="#bbffbb"
| 46 || May 23 || Braves || 2–1 || || || || || 24–22
|- align="center" bgcolor="#ffbbbb"
| 47 || May 24 || Braves || 6–10 || || || || || 24–23
|- align="center" bgcolor="#bbffbb"
| 48 || May 26 || Cardinals || 7–1 || || || || || 25–23
|- align="center" bgcolor="#ffbbbb"
| 49 || May 27 || Cardinals || 3–4 || || || || || 25–24
|- align="center" bgcolor="#bbffbb"
| 50 || May 28 || Cardinals || 10–8 || || || || || 26–24
|- align="center" bgcolor="#ffbbbb"
| 51 || May 29 || Rockies || 0–5 || || || || || 26–25
|- align="center" bgcolor="#bbffbb"
| 52 || May 30 || Rockies || 2–0 || || || || || 27–25
|- align="center" bgcolor="#bbffbb"
| 53 || May 31 || Rockies || 3–2 || || || || || 28–25
|-

|- align="center" bgcolor="#bbffbb"
| 54 || June 2 || @ Pirates || 7–0 || || || || || 29–25
|- align="center" bgcolor="#ffbbbb"
| 55 || June 3 || @ Pirates || 4–6 || || || || || 29–26
|- align="center" bgcolor="#bbffbb"
| 56 || June 4 || @ Pirates || 1–0 || || || || || 30–26
|- align="center" bgcolor="#ffbbbb"
| 57 || June 5 || @ Brewers || 2–5 || || || || || 30–27
|- align="center" bgcolor="#ffbbbb"
| 58 || June 6 || @ Brewers || 1–5 || || || || || 30–28
|- align="center" bgcolor="#bbffbb"
| 59 || June 7 || @ Brewers || 6–5 || || || || || 31–28
|- align="center" bgcolor="#ffbbbb"
| 60 || June 8 || @ Brewers || 3–4 || || || || || 31–29
|- align="center" bgcolor="#bbffbb"
| 61 || June 9 || Marlins || 3–2 || || || || || 32–29
|- align="center" bgcolor="#ffbbbb"
| 62 || June 10 || Marlins || 1–2 || || || || || 32–30
|- align="center" bgcolor="#ffbbbb"
| 63 || June 11 || Marlins || 3–7 || || || || || 32–31
|- align="center" bgcolor="#bbffbb"
| 64 || June 13 || Dodgers || 9–1 || || || || || 33–31
|- align="center" bgcolor="#bbffbb"
| 65 || June 14 || Dodgers || 5–3 || || || || || 34–31
|- align="center" bgcolor="#ffbbbb"
| 66 || June 15 || Dodgers || 3–7 || || || || || 34–32
|- align="center" bgcolor="#bbffbb"
| 67 || June 16 || @ Angels || 5–4 || || || || || 35–32
|- align="center" bgcolor="#ffbbbb"
| 68 || June 17 || @ Angels || 2–3 || || || || || 35–33
|- align="center" bgcolor="#bbffbb"
| 69 || June 18 || @ Angels || 7–3 || || || || || 36–33
|- align="center" bgcolor="#bbffbb"
| 70 || June 20 || @ Rangers || 6–5 || || || || || 37–33
|- align="center" bgcolor="#bbffbb"
| 71 || June 21 || @ Rangers || 3–2 || || || || || 38–33
|- align="center" bgcolor="#ffbbbb"
| 72 || June 22 || @ Rangers || 3–5 || || || || || 38–34
|- align="center" bgcolor="#bbffbb"
| 73 || June 23 || Mariners || 2–1 || || || || || 39–34
|- align="center" bgcolor="#ffbbbb"
| 74 || June 24 || Mariners || 5–9 || || || || || 39–35
|- align="center" bgcolor="#ffbbbb"
| 75 || June 25 || Mariners || 4–9 || || || || || 39–36
|- align="center" bgcolor="#bbffbb"
| 76 || June 27 || Athletics || 3–0 || || || || || 40–36
|- align="center" bgcolor="#bbffbb"
| 77 || June 28 || Athletics || 8–1 || || || || || 41–36
|- align="center" bgcolor="#ffbbbb"
| 78 || June 29 || Athletics || 5–6 || || || || || 41–37
|- align="center" bgcolor="#bbffbb"
| 79 || June 30 || Giants || 6–5 || || || || || 42–37
|-

|- align="center" bgcolor="#bbffbb"
| 80 || July 1 (1) || Giants || 7–4 || || || || || 43–37
|- align="center" bgcolor="#ffbbbb"
| 81 || July 1 (2) || Giants || 1–4 || || || || || 43–38
|- align="center" bgcolor="#ffbbbb"
| 82 || July 2 || Giants || 2–6 || || || || || 43–39
|- align="center" bgcolor="#ffbbbb"
| 83 || July 4 || @ Phillies || 5–6 || || || || || 43–40
|- align="center" bgcolor="#bbffbb"
| 84 || July 5 || @ Phillies || 6–3 || || || || || 44–40
|- align="center" bgcolor="#bbffbb"
| 85 || July 6 || @ Phillies || 5–3 || || || || || 45–40
|- align="center" bgcolor="#bbffbb"
| 86 || July 7 || @ Nationals || 3–2 || || || || || 46–40
|- align="center" bgcolor="#bbffbb"
| 87 || July 8 || @ Nationals || 5–2 || || || || || 47–40
|- align="center" bgcolor="#bbffbb"
| 88 || July 9 || @ Nationals || 10–9 || || || || || 48–40
|- align="center" bgcolor="#ffbbbb"
| 89 || July 14 || Braves || 12–15 || || || || || 48–41
|- align="center" bgcolor="#ffbbbb"
| 90 || July 15 || Braves || 3–11 || || || || || 48–42
|- align="center" bgcolor="#ffbbbb"
| 91 || July 16 || Braves || 5–10 || || || || || 48–43
|- align="center" bgcolor="#bbffbb"
| 92 || July 17 || Phillies || 8–6 || || || || || 49–43
|- align="center" bgcolor="#bbffbb"
| 93 || July 18 || Phillies || 10–6 || || || || || 50–43
|- align="center" bgcolor="#ffbbbb"
| 94 || July 19 || Phillies || 4–5 || || || || || 50–44
|- align="center" bgcolor="#ffbbbb"
| 95 || July 20 || @ Giants || 3–9 || || || || || 50–45
|- align="center" bgcolor="#ffbbbb"
| 96 || July 21 || @ Giants || 2–8 || || || || || 50–46
|- align="center" bgcolor="#ffbbbb"
| 97 || July 22 || @ Giants || 3–4 || || || || || 50–47
|- align="center" bgcolor="#bbffbb"
| 98 || July 23 || @ Giants || 6–5 || || || || || 51–47
|- align="center" bgcolor="#bbffbb"
| 99 || July 24 || @ Dodgers || 7–6 || || || || || 52–47
|- align="center" bgcolor="#bbffbb"
| 100 || July 25 || @ Dodgers || 7–3 || || || || || 53–47
|- align="center" bgcolor="#bbffbb"
| 101 || July 26 || @ Dodgers || 10–3 || || || || || 54–47
|- align="center" bgcolor="#ffbbbb"
| 102 || July 27 || @ Rockies || 8–9 || || || || || 54–48
|- align="center" bgcolor="#ffbbbb"
| 103 || July 28 || @ Rockies || 1–3 || || || || || 54–49
|- align="center" bgcolor="#bbffbb"
| 104 || July 29 || @ Rockies || 4–2 || || || || || 55–49
|- align="center" bgcolor="#ffbbbb"
| 105 || July 30 || @ Rockies || 1–3 || || || || || 55–50
|-

|- align="center" bgcolor="#ffbbbb"
| 106 || August 1 || Astros || 0–1 || || || || || 55–51
|- align="center" bgcolor="#ffbbbb"
| 107 || August 2 || Astros || 1–7 || || || || || 55–52
|- align="center" bgcolor="#bbffbb"
| 108 || August 3 || Astros || 5–2 || || || || || 56–52
|- align="center" bgcolor="#ffbbbb"
| 109 || August 4 || Nationals || 2–6 || || || || || 56–53
|- align="center" bgcolor="#bbffbb"
| 110 || August 5 || Nationals || 6–3 || || || || || 57–53
|- align="center" bgcolor="#bbffbb"
| 111 || August 6 || Nationals || 3–2 || || || || || 58–53
|- align="center" bgcolor="#ffbbbb"
| 112 || August 8 || @ Mets || 2–3 || || || || || 58–54
|- align="center" bgcolor="#ffbbbb"
| 113 || August 9 || @ Mets || 3–4 || || || || || 58–55
|- align="center" bgcolor="#ffbbbb"
| 114 || August 10 || @ Mets || 3–7 || || || || || 58–56
|- align="center" bgcolor="#ffbbbb"
| 115 || August 11 || @ Astros || 2–4 || || || || || 58–57
|- align="center" bgcolor="#bbffbb"
| 116 || August 12 || @ Astros || 6–3 || || || || || 59–57
|- align="center" bgcolor="#bbffbb"
| 117 || August 13 || @ Astros || 7–2 || || || || || 60–57
|- align="center" bgcolor="#ffbbbb"
| 118 || August 14 || Giants || 0–1 || || || || || 60–58
|- align="center" bgcolor="#ffbbbb"
| 119 || August 15 || Giants || 2–3 || || || || || 60–59
|- align="center" bgcolor="#ffbbbb"
| 120 || August 16 || Giants || 5–7 || || || || || 60–60
|- align="center" bgcolor="#ffbbbb"
| 121 || August 17 || Giants || 4–8 || || || || || 60–61
|- align="center" bgcolor="#bbffbb"
| 122 || August 18 || Dbacks || 8–2 || || || || || 61–61
|- align="center" bgcolor="#ffbbbb"
| 123 || August 19 || Dbacks || 3–5 || || || || || 61–62
|- align="center" bgcolor="#bbffbb"
| 124 || August 20 || Dbacks || 2–1 || || || || || 62–62
|- align="center" bgcolor="#bbffbb"
| 125 || August 21 || Dodgers || 4–2 || || || || || 63–62
|- align="center" bgcolor="#bbffbb"
| 126 || August 22 || Dodgers || 1–0 || || || || || 64–62
|- align="center" bgcolor="#bbffbb"
| 127 || August 23 || Dodgers || 7–2 || || || || || 65–62
|- align="center" bgcolor="#ffbbbb"
| 128 || August 25 || @ Rockies || 5–13 || || || || || 65–63
|- align="center" bgcolor="#bbffbb"
| 129 || August 26 || @ Rockies || 5–2 || || || || || 66–63
|- align="center" bgcolor="#ffbbbb"
| 130 || August 27 || @ Rockies || 3–6 || || || || || 66–64
|- align="center" bgcolor="#ffbbbb"
| 131 || August 28 || @ Dbacks || 4–7 || || || || || 66–65
|- align="center" bgcolor="#bbffbb"
| 132 || August 29 || @ Dbacks || 8–3 || || || || || 67–65
|- align="center" bgcolor="#bbffbb"
| 133 || August 30 || @ Dbacks || 4–1 || || || || || 68–65
|-

|- align="center" bgcolor="#ffbbbb"
| 134 || September 1 || Reds || 2–6 || || || || || 68–66
|- align="center" bgcolor="#bbffbb"
| 135 || September 2 || Reds || 7–1 || || || || || 69–66
|- align="center" bgcolor="#bbffbb"
| 136 || September 3 || Reds || 2–1 || || || || || 70–66
|- align="center" bgcolor="#bbffbb"
| 137 || September 4 || Rockies || 7–5 || || || || || 71–66
|- align="center" bgcolor="#bbffbb"
| 138 || September 5 || Rockies || 5–4 || || || || || 72–66
|- align="center" bgcolor="#bbffbb"
| 139 || September 6 || Rockies || 2–0 || || || || || 73–66
|- align="center" bgcolor="#ffbbbb"
| 140 || September 8 || @ Giants || 0–4 || || || || || 73–67
|- align="center" bgcolor="#ffbbbb"
| 141 || September 9 || @ Giants || 4–5 || || || || || 73–68
|- align="center" bgcolor="#bbffbb"
| 142 || September 10 || @ Giants || 10–2 || || || || || 74–68
|- align="center" bgcolor="#ffbbbb"
| 143 || September 12 || @ Reds || 4–5 || || || || || 74–69
|- align="center" bgcolor="#bbffbb"
| 144 || September 13 || @ Reds || 10–0 || || || || || 75–69
|- align="center" bgcolor="#bbffbb"
| 145 || September 14 || @ Reds || 4–2 || || || || || 76–69
|- align="center" bgcolor="#ffbbbb"
| 146 || September 15 || @ Dodgers || 1–3 || || || || || 76–70
|- align="center" bgcolor="#bbffbb"
| 147 || September 16 || @ Dodgers || 11–2 || || || || || 77–70
|- align="center" bgcolor="#bbffbb"
| 148 || September 17 || @ Dodgers || 2–1 || || || || || 78–70
|- align="center" bgcolor="#ffbbbb"
| 149 || September 18 || @ Dodgers || 10–11 || || || || || 78–71
|- align="center" bgcolor="#bbffbb"
| 150 || September 19 || Dbacks || 5–2 || || || || || 79–71
|- align="center" bgcolor="#ffbbbb"
| 151 || September 20 || Dbacks || 2–8 || || || || || 79–72
|- align="center" bgcolor="#bbffbb"
| 152 || September 21 || Dbacks || 3–1 || || || || || 80–72
|- align="center" bgcolor="#bbffbb"
| 153 || September 22 || Pirates || 6–2 || || || || || 81–72
|- align="center" bgcolor="#bbffbb"
| 154 || September 23 || Pirates || 2–1 || || || || || 82–72
|- align="center" bgcolor="#bbffbb"
| 155 || September 24 || Pirates || 2–1 || || || || || 83–72
|- align="center" bgcolor="#bbffbb"
| 156 || September 25 || @ Cardinals || 6–5 || || || || || 84–72
|- align="center" bgcolor="#bbffbb"
| 157 || September 26 || @ Cardinals || 7–5 || || || || || 85–72
|- align="center" bgcolor="#ffbbbb"
| 158 || September 27 || @ Cardinals || 2–4 || || || || || 85–73
|- align="center" bgcolor="#bbffbb"
| 159 || September 28 || @ Dbacks || 12–4 || || || || || 86–73
|- align="center" bgcolor="#ffbbbb"
| 160 || September 29 || @ Dbacks || 1–3 || || || || || 86–74
|- align="center" bgcolor="#bbffbb"
| 161 || September 30 || @ Dbacks || 3–1 || || || || || 87–74
|- align="center" bgcolor="#bbffbb"
| 162 || October 1 || @ Dbacks || 7–6 || || || || || 88–74
|-

Postseason Game Log

|- align="center" bgcolor="#ffbbbb"
| 1 || October 3 || Cardinals || 1–5 || || || || || 0–1
|- align="center" bgcolor="#ffbbbb"
| 2 || October 5 || Cardinals || 0–2 || || || || || 0–2
|- align="center" bgcolor="#bbffbb"
| 3 || October 7 || @ Cardinals || 3–1 || || || || || 1–2
|- align="center" bgcolor="#ffbbbb"
| 4 || October 8 || @ Cardinals || 2–6 || || || || || 1–3
|-

Roster

Player stats

Batting

Starters by position
Note: Pos = Position; G = Games played; AB = At bats; H = Hits; Avg. = Batting average; HR = Home runs; RBI = Runs batted in

Other batters
Note: G = Games played; AB = At bats; H = Hits; Avg. = Batting average; HR = Home runs; RBI = Runs batted in

Pitching

Starting pitchers 
Note: G = Games pitched; IP = Innings pitched; W = Wins; L = Losses; ERA = Earned run average; SO = Strikeouts

Other pitchers 
Note: G = Games pitched; IP = Innings pitched; W = Wins; L = Losses; ERA = Earned run average; SO = Strikeouts

Relief pitchers 
Note: G = Games pitched; W = Wins; L = Losses; SV = Saves; ERA = Earned run average; SO = Strikeouts

National League Division Series

San Diego Padres vs. St. Louis Cardinals
St. Louis wins the series, 3-1

Award winners

Rawlings Gold Glove Winners
 Mike Cameron, OF

National League Fireman of the Year
 Trevor Hoffman, The Sporting News, Rolaids

National League Pitcher of the Month
 Chris Young, May 2006

2006 Major League Baseball All-Star Game
 Trevor Hoffman, reserve

Farm system 

LEAGUE CHAMPIONS: AZL Padres

References

External links
 2006 San Diego Padres at Baseball Reference
 2006 San Diego Padres at Baseball Almanac
 

San Diego Padres seasons
San Diego Padres season
National League West champion seasons
San Diego